Saving Our Selves: A BET COVID-19 Relief Effort, or simply, Saving Our Selves, was a 2020 television special which aired on the American television network BET on April 22, 2020, during the COVID-19 pandemic. Hosted by Anthony Anderson, Kelly Rowland, Terrence J, and Regina Hall, the two-hour special was made to raise funds for the BET COVID-19 Relief Effort Fund, established by BET in collaboration with United Way Worldwide, aimed to support African Americans who have been severely impacted by the pandemic.

The special was simulcast on sister channels BET Her and MTV2 (with an immediate encore broadcast on VH1), along with Bounce TV. It was also broadcast worldwide via BET International and streamed on BET's website and its social media platforms, along with BET+, Tidal and Pluto TV.

It was later reported that the special has raised $16 million in funds.

Performances

Appearances

 Chance the Rapper
 Deon Cole
 Tina Lifford
 Angela Rye
 Lil Wayne
 Fat Joe
 Whoopi Goldberg
 MC Lyte
 Queen Latifah
 DJ Premier
 Sean Combs
 Charlamagne tha God
 Dr. Rheeda Walker
 Kareem Abdul-Jabbar
 Keisha Lance Bottoms
 DJ Khaled
 Halle Berry
 Idris Elba
 Symone Sanders
 D-Nice
 Tiffany Haddish
 Ciara
 Nomalanga Shozi
 Flora Coquerel
 Jourdan Riane
 Young T & Bugsey
 Sabrina Elba
 Lizzo
 Morris Chestnut
 Al Sharpton
 Don Cheadle
 Kevin Hart
 Cupid (Singer)

See also
Impact of the COVID-19 pandemic on television in the United States

References

External links
 
 

2020 in American television
2020 television specials
BET original programming
Impact of the COVID-19 pandemic in the United States
Television shows about the COVID-19 pandemic